Bonne Bay Marine Station is a marine ecology research and teaching facility on Bonne Bay along Newfoundland's west coast. It offers services to students, researchers, educators and the general public. The station is within Gros Morne National Park, a recognized UNESCO World Heritage Site. The aquarium portion of the facility is open to visitors. Interactive aquariums tours are provided to walk-ins, as well as school and community groups. The tour offers exhibits the latest research while showcasing marine flora and fauna in the station's aquaria and touch tank.
Officially opened on 6 Sept, 2002, the Bonne Bay Marine Station is operated by Memorial University of Newfoundland and the Gros Morne Co-operating Association. Funding was provided by Atlantic Canada Opportunities Agency (ACOA) and the Newfoundland and Labrador Provincial
Government.

Mandate 

 To provide an infrastructure and environment that is supportive of first-class teaching and research in marine science.
 To support significant activities in public education and regional economic development via its interpretive components, gift area and other programs operated in its facilities.

Facility 

 Modern teaching and research laboratories
 Library and computer resource center
 Accommodations wing (up to 31 people)
 Kitchen/Dining Area
 Fully equipped 60 seat theatre
 Full range of physical and biological oceanographic equipment, including:
 Several small boats
 Scuba Equipment
 Plankton nets
 Niskin bottles
 Bottom grabs
 Beach seine
 CTD
 Submarine digital Amphibico/Sony video system
 Assorted collecting pots and nets
 Salinity/Temperature meters
 Flow through seawater aquaria for public displays
 Flow through seawater aquaria for research
 Public aquarium displays
 Marine touch tank
 Gift area

Research 

The Bonne Bay Marine Station provides oceanographers, biologists and other scientists with a facility for marine ecosystem research. 
The Bonne Bay area accesses biodiversity in icy fjords basins, salmon estuaries, Arctic kelp beds, salt marshes and the open Gulf of St. Lawrence. Resident populations of offshore animals and Arctic species are easily accessible.

Current projects

The Bonne Bay Marine Station promotes multi-disciplinary research collaboration between scientists, industry, government agencies and community organizations. Areas of interest include oceanography, marine ecology/biology and aquaculture. 
Ongoing research includes:
 Kelp and Sea Urchin aquaculture
 Native species are cultured and evaluated for aquaculture potential; techniques are devised and tested
 Ecology of snow crab and lobster
 Fisheries & Coastal Community
 Benthic and planktonic sampling
 Habitat sensitivity; environmental assessment
 Species at risk research (Wolffish species, Acadian Redfish etc.)
 Atlantic Cod Research
 Biodiversity of seaweeds and invertebrates

The Station's facilities and support services are available to researchers who wish to undertake research.

Education

Semester by the Sea 

Five undergraduate field courses in Marine Biology are offered at the Bonne Bay Marine Station during the spring/summer semester, with additional courses being offered during the fall/winter semesters. Two graduate field courses are available and additionally arrangements are often made for other graduate courses in Bonne Bay.

Undergraduate

Biology 3709 - Marine Principles and Techniques 
Biology 3714 - Estuarine Fish Ecology 
Biology 4014 - Biology of Boreal and Arctic Seaweeds 
Biology 4710 - Experimental Marine Ecology of Newfoundland Waters 
Biology 4912 - Marine Mammals

Fall/Winter Courses
Biology 3709 - Marine Principles and Techniques 
Biology 4810 - Marine Research Field Course

Graduate

Biology 7535 - Research Methods in Marine Science Techniques

Biology 6110 - Advanced Phycology

Public programing 

Through a public education program, visitors, school groups, and community groups may observe marine flora and fauna in the stations aquaria, and learn about the latest research. Guided tours are provided by Marine Education Interpreters, Discovery Tours of Bonne Bay are offered in partnership with the local boat tour operators, and Sea Kayaking for Nature Lovers tour with Marine Education Interpreters are available throughout the summer season.

History 

30 years ago the Bonne Bay Marine Station was a small field station of Memorial University. The original station was a 2-storey house. The top floor had a small kitchen, a living room and three small bedrooms. The main floor had two larger rooms that were converted into labs and a small bathroom that was converted into a chemical lab where radioactive work and the chemical work was performed. It had a full basement, and there was an old fish store as a second building.

Dr. Bob Hooper first visited the Bonne Bay area then and was taken with its breathtaking beauty, amazing marine biodiversity, and potential as a prime location for teaching and research. He helped convert this outport house with a fishing store into a marine teaching and research facility.

Summer teaching activities began in 1979 with a single two week program. By 2001 seven, two week academic programs were running from mid April to September. The student demand for courses, and high level of research interest, often exceeded the available space. In addition, local visitors and summer tourists were frequently "dropping in" to view the aquarium, and learn about the latest research ventures. The existing station could no longer accommodate the needs for the facility. A new teaching and research facility plan was developed.

The official opening of the new Bonne Bay Marine Station occurred September 6, 2002. Built on the site of the old station this $3.2 million facility was funded by the Atlantic Canada Opportunities Agency; the Gros Morne Co-operating Association; the Department of Industry, Trade and Rural Development, Government of Newfoundland and Labrador; and Memorial University.

CURRA 

The Community-University Research for Recovery Alliance (CURRA) is a 5-year research program centered at Bonne Bay Marine Station. This program of innovative, interdisciplinary research projects is helping communities and organizations along Newfoundland's west coast develop strategies for the recovery of fish stocks and fishery communities.

The CURRA brings together researchers from the social and natural sciences and fine arts at Memorial University in St. John's and Sir Wilfred Grenfell College in Corner Brook in working partnerships with numerous stakeholders and community organizations.

The long-term objectives of the CURRA include promoting community engagement with the Station, promoting and diversifying the research community affiliated with the Station and training researchers in collaborative, community-based research approaches.

References

External links
Bonne Bay Marine Station

Memorial University of Newfoundland
Research institutes in Canada
2002 establishments in Newfoundland and Labrador
Nature reserves in Newfoundland and Labrador
Biological research institutes
Marine biological stations
Tourist attractions in Newfoundland and Labrador